The 1949 Delaware Fightin' Blue Hens football team was an American football team that represented the University of Delaware as an independent during the 1949 college football season. In its seventh season under head coach William D. Murray, the team compiled an 8–1 record and outscored opponents by a total of 202 to 67. John Miller and Mariano Stalloni were the team captains. The team played its home games at Wilmington Park in Wilmington, Delaware.

Schedule

References

Delaware
Delaware Fightin' Blue Hens football seasons
Delaware Fightin' Blue Hens football